Thomas Fane (1626–1692), of Burston, Hunton, Kent, was an English politician.

He was a Member (MP) of the Parliament of England for Maidstone in 1679 and 1681.

References

1626 births
1692 deaths
English MPs 1679
People from Hunton, Kent
English MPs 1681
Thomas